The Two Rivers Dam is a dry dam in southeastern New Mexico, sixteen miles west-southwest of the city of Roswell. The dam is actually two dams separated by an area of higher land approximately 1.5 miles wide. Normally, no water is impounded behind the dams; they are strictly for flood control. However, during the spring runoff water will back up behind the northern dam. This has created a small oasis in the lowlands behind the dam.

Both dams are earth-fill dams with coarse rubble on the faces to prevent erosion. The tops of both dams are 4058 feet above sea level. During a flood, each dam's reservoir is separate until the water reaches 4000 feet above sea level, at which point the two reservoirs combine to form a single large reservoir.

Northern Dam

The northern dam, also known as the Diamond A dam or the first dam, is 5000 feet long and 95 feet tall. It is 525 feet wide at the base and 24 feet wide at the top. It crosses the Hondo River. At the base of the dam there is a flood control gate which can be closed to prevent flood waters from flowing downstream. The gate is normally left open to allow the river to flow freely. The gate is only closed when it is necessary to prevent flooding. This dam has a two lane gravel road across the top which is open to the public. The southern dam is accessed by crossing the northern dam.

Southern Dam

The southern dam, also known as the second dam, is 2950 feet long and 107 feet tall. It is 600 feet wide at the base and 18 feet wide at the top. It crosses the Rocky Arroyo, which is an intermittent stream. Rocky Arroyo doesn't normally have water flowing through it and the impoundment area behind the dam is much drier than the impoundment area behind the northern dam.

History

The city of Roswell suffered devastating floods in 1937, 1941, and 1954. After the 1954 flood, the US Congress passed the Watershed Protection and Flood Prevention Act of 1954 which authorized the Corps of Engineers to build dams to protect Roswell from floods. The dams were completed in 1963.

References

Dams in New Mexico
Earth-filled dams
Dams completed in 1963
1963 establishments in New Mexico
Buildings and structures in Chaves County, New Mexico
United States Army Corps of Engineers dams